Nigilgia anactis is a moth in the family Brachodidae. It was described by Alexey Diakonoff in 1982. It is found in Sri Lanka.

Description
The wingspan of the adult is 12 mm. Both sexes are alike. Head deep dull gray. Antenna black. Thorax deep dull gray. Abdomen dull gray with a silvery gloss. Venter whitish. Forewings oblong suboval. Apex and termen round. Forewings are blackish with white scales. Broad velvety-black transverse bands present along both sides. A submarginal golden scaly thick streak present. A golden dot visible above end of fold. Cilia purple. Hindwings dark purple. Cilia fuscous with dark gray around the apex.

References

Brachodidae
Moths described in 1982